The 2009 World Sambo Championships was held in Thessaloniki, Greece between the 5th and 9 November 2009.
This tournament included competition in both sport Sambo, and Combat Sambo.

Categories 
Combat Sambo: 52 kg, 57 kg, 62 kg, 68 kg, 74 kg, 82 kg, 90 kg, 100 kg, +100 kg
Men's Sambo: 52 kg, 57 kg, 62 kg, 68 kg, 74 kg, 82 kg, 90 kg, 100 kg, +100 kg
Women's Sambo: 48 kg, 52 kg, 56 kg, 60 kg, 64 kg, 68 kg, 72 kg, 80 kg, +80 kg

Medal overview

Combat Sambo Events

Women's events

Men's Sambo Events

Medal table

External links 
 

World Sambo Championships
World Sambo Championships, 2009
Sports competitions in Thessaloniki
2009 in sambo (martial art)